The 1993 Dubai Tennis Championships, also known by its sponsored name Duty Free Dubai / BMW Tennis Open, was the inaugural edition of this men's tennis tournament and was played on outdoor hard courts. The tournament was part of the World Series of the 1993 ATP Tour. It took place in Dubai, United Arab Emirates from 1 February through 7 February 1993. Third-seeded Karel Nováček won the singles title.

Finals

Singles

 Karel Nováček defeated  Fabrice Santoro 6–4, 7–5
 It was Nováček's first singles title of the year and the 11th of his career.

Doubles

 John Fitzgerald /  Anders Järryd defeated  Grant Connell /  Patrick Galbraith 6–2, 6–1

References

External links
 ATP tournament profile
 ITF tournament details

 
1993